The following is a list of Campbell Fighting Camels basketball head coaches. There have been seven head coaches of the Fighting Camels in their 77-season history.

Campbell's current head coach is Kevin McGeehan. He was hired as the Fighting Camels' head coach in March 2019, replacing Robbie Laing, who was fired after the 2012–13 season.

References

Campbell

Campbell Fighting Camels basketball coaches